Conrad Khunrath (1555, Leipzig – 1613, probably in Hamburg) was a German merchant, alchemist, mint worker, doctor, author, editor, and translator.

Life
Conrad Khunrath was born around 1555 to the Leipzig merchant Sebastian Kunrat and his wife Anna. He had at least ten younger siblings, among them Heinrich Khunrath, who became known as an alchemist in his own right. By 1562, Conrad, still a child, had enrolled at Leipzig University, though this seems to have been only pro forma. In his youth, Conrad traveled around England where he learned the English language. He is known to have worked as a merchant from 1580; after the death of his father, Conrad also took over the cloth and vitriol trade. Subsequently, Khunrath expanded his professional activities into medical practice. His medications relied on spagyric or alchemical processes he developed himself.

By 1594, Khurath resided in Schleswig.  There he published the first edition of his magnum opus , as well as a number of ancillary works and later editions. From about 1606 Khunrath worked as coin controller for the mint in Hamburg, managing the upheavals of the Kipper und Wipper financial crisis. He died, probably in Hamburg, shortly before 6 May 1613.

Selected works
As author
 . Schleswig, 1594. 
  (Volume 1, 1621; Volume 1, 1623; Volume 1, 1638; Volume 2, 1638.)
 . Schleswig, 1596.
 . Schleswig, 1597.
 . Hamburg, 1600
  Frankfurt, Leipzig, Halberstadt: Hynitzsch, 1680. (Volume 1, 1860; Volume 2, 1860.)

As editor or translator
 . Schleswig, 1595.
 . Hamburg, 1605.
 . Hamburg, 1606.
 . Hamburg, 1607.

References

Notes

Bibliography
 Humberg, Oliver.  , 2. Elberfeld, 2006.
 Moller, Johannes. , 439. Copenhagen, 1744.

External links
 , Part 1. (1614)
 , Part 2. (1621)

German alchemists
German merchants
German male writers
1555 births
1613 deaths
16th-century German businesspeople
17th-century German businesspeople
16th-century alchemists
17th-century alchemists